The 2023 Open Nouvelle-Calédonie was a professional tennis tournament played on hard courts. It was the 18th edition of the tournament which was part of the 2023 ATP Challenger Tour. It took place in Nouméa, New Caledonia between 2 and 7 January 2023.

Singles main-draw entrants

Seeds

 1 Rankings are as of 26 December 2022.

Other entrants
The following players received wildcards into the singles main draw:
  Thomas Fancutt
  Victor Lopes
  Toshihide Matsui

The following players received entry from the qualifying draw:
  Jake Delaney
  Blake Ellis
  Jeremy Jin
  Blake Mott
  Calum Puttergill
  Brandon Walkin

Champions

Singles

 Raúl Brancaccio def.  Laurent Lokoli 4–6, 7–5, 6–2.

Doubles

 Colin Sinclair /  Rubin Statham def.  Toshihide Matsui /  Kaito Uesugi 6–4, 6–3.

References

2023 ATP Challenger Tour
2023
January 2023 sports events in Oceania